Carsten Ball and Chris Guccione were the defending champions, but decided not to participate.

Matthew Ebden and Ryan Harrison defeated Johan Brunström and Adil Shamasdin in the final of this tournament.

Seeds

  Scott Lipsky /  Rajeev Ram (quarterfinals)
  Marcelo Melo /  André Sá (semifinals)
  James Cerretani /  Philipp Marx (first round)
  Johan Brunström /  Adil Shamasdin (final)

Draw

Draw

References
 Main Draw

Doubles